Parvathy Arun also known by her stage name Nidhi Arun is an Indian actress who works on Malayalam, Tamil, Telugu and Kannada films.

Career
She was born at Trivandrum, Kerala to Arun and Manju. She did her schooling at Shantiniketan School . She made her movie debut as parallel female lead through Chembarathipoo (2017). She played the female lead in her second movie, Ennaalum Sarath..? (2018). She played one of the three important female characters in her Kannada debut through Geetha (2019). She then went on to play the female lead in Mouname Ishtam which marked her Telugu debut. She returned to Malayalam through the lead role in Kalikkoottukaar and Irupathiyonnaam Noottaandu. She is set to make her Tamil debut as the heroine in Memories opposite Vetri. Another unreleased movie of her is Kannada movie Lankasura.

Filmography

References

External links

Year of birth missing (living people)
Living people
Actresses from Thiruvananthapuram
Actresses in Tamil cinema
Actresses in Telugu cinema
Indian film actresses
Actresses in Malayalam cinema
Actresses in Kannada cinema
21st-century Indian actresses